Perry Daniel Thompson (1874-1952) served as the forty sixth Mayor of Lowell, Massachusetts.

Thompson attended Lowell Public Schools and Phillips Academy. He was a member of the school committee from 1913 to 1914, mayor from 1918 to 1921, a member of the election committee in 1929, and city clerk from 1930 to 1945.

References

1874 births
Phillips Academy alumni
Mayors of Lowell, Massachusetts
Massachusetts Republicans
School board members in Massachusetts
1952 deaths